USS Shuttle (SP-3572), also listed as ID-3572, was a United States Navy patrol vessel in commission from 1918 to 1919.

Shuttle was built as a private steam yacht in 1906 by the Herreshoff Manufacturing Company at Bristol, Rhode Island. On 31 October 1918, the U.S. Navy acquired her at Glen Cove, New York, from her owner, H. P. Davidson of New York, for use as a section patrol boat during World War I and assigned her a naval identification number; sources disagree on whether the number was the section patrol number SP-3572 or the naval registry identification number ID-3572. World War I ended eleven days after her acquisition.

Assigned to the Navys Bureau of Ordnance, Shuttle served on the Potomac River, transporting personnel between the Washington Navy Yard in Washington, D.C., the Naval Proving Ground at Indian Head, Maryland, and the ordnance facility at Machodoc Creek.

The Navy returned Shuttle to Davidson on 28 March 1919 at Glenwood Landing, New York.

Notes

References

Department of the Navy Naval History and Heritage Command Online Library of Selected Images: Civilian Ships: Shuttle (Steam Yacht, 1906). Served as USS Shuttle (ID # 3572) in 1918-1919
NavSource Online: Section Patrol Craft Photo Archive Shuttle (SP 3572)

Patrol vessels of the United States Navy
World War I patrol vessels of the United States
Ships built in Bristol, Rhode Island
1906 ships
Individual yachts